Antipionycha puncticollis is a species of beetle in the family Carabidae, the only species in the genus Antipionycha.

References

Ctenodactylinae